Baraolt is a town and administrative district in Covasna County, Romania. It lies in the Székely Land, an ethno-cultural region in eastern Transylvania. The town was mentioned for the first time as a settlement in 1224. It administers five villages:
Biborțeni / Bibarcfalva
Bodoș / Bodos
Căpeni / Köpec
Micloșoara / Miklósvár
Racoșul de Sus / Felsőrákos

Demographics 

According to the 2011 Census, Baraolt has a population of 8,567 and an absolute Székely Hungarian majority 8,213 (96%) Hungarians, 237 (3%) Romanians, 100 Roma, 15 others). Approximately 47.9% of the town's inhabitants adhere to the Hungarian Reformed Church, while 29.9% follow Roman Catholicism, 16.8% consider themselves Unitarians and 2.6% are Romanian Orthodox. According to the 2011 Census the ethnic composition of the town was as follows: Székely Hungarian made up (9,271 (95.87%) Hungarians, 300 (3.1%) Romanians, 84 Roma, 15 others).

The town has one high school and a provincial hospital with 82 beds. The hospital's specialties include internal medicine, surgery, obstetrics & gynecology, and paediatrics; it also has an accident and emergency service.

Demographic movement according to the censuses:

References

External links

  About the town on Covasna County's Prefecture's Site 
  About the town on Covasna County's Council's site 

Towns in Romania
Populated places in Covasna County
Localities in Transylvania